Frédéric Chopin's Impromptu No. 2 in F major, Op. 36 was composed in 1839 and published in the following year.

Music 
The Impromptu begins with a nocturne-like atmosphere. Deep bass notes cue a passionate section, which is then followed by a lighter section with quick runs. The nocturne-like atmosphere returns, and the piece ends in a passionate F# major chord.

The piece is in the rare key of F major, which is used in very few major compositions in the Romantic era outside of piano music. Larger examples of works in this key are Ludwig van Beethoven's Piano Sonata No. 24 and Chopin's famous Barcarolle.

References

External links 
 

Compositions by Frédéric Chopin
Compositions for solo piano
1839 compositions
Compositions in F-sharp major

fr:Impromptu nº 2 de Chopin